Keskinen is a Finnish surname. Notable people with the surname include:

 Sylvi Keskinen (1933–2013), Finnish hurdler
 Jouko Keskinen (born 1950), Finnish actor
 Esa Keskinen (born 1965), Finnish hockey player

Finnish-language surnames